Gossweilera is a genus of African flowering plants in the daisy family.

The genus is named for the Swiss-born Angolan botanist, John Gossweiler (1873-1952), who collected the type specimen of G. lanceolata.

 Species
 Gossweilera lanceolata S.Moore - Angola
 Gossweilera paludosa S.Moore - Angola

References

Vernonieae
Asteraceae genera
Flora of Angola